Akilah Castello (born 13 October 1987) is a Guyanese football manager and a retired footballer who played as a midfielder. She has played for the Guyana women's national football team. She is the current head coach of the Guyana women's national under-17 team.

She also coaches U-15

Since the national team is made up mostly of internationally based or born players, Castello handles coaching for the smaller, local U-20 contingent.

In 2017, Castello was named Female Coach of the Year by the Guyana Football Federation.

International career
Castello capped for Guyana at senior level during the 2010 CONCACAF Women's World Cup Qualifying qualification.

See also
List of Guyana women's international footballers

References

1987 births
Living people
Guyanese women's footballers
Guyana women's international footballers
Women's association football midfielders
Guyanese football managers
Female association football managers
Women's association football managers